Christian Campbell (born November 27, 1995) is an American football cornerback who is a free agent. He played college football at Penn State.

Professional career

Arizona Cardinals
Campbell was drafted by the Arizona Cardinals in the sixth round (182nd overall) of the 2018 NFL Draft. The pick used to select him was previously acquired from the Denver Broncos in exchange for Jared Veldheer. On May 11, 2018, he signed his rookie contract. He was waived on September 1, 2018.

New Orleans Saints
On October 17, 2018, Campbell was signed to the New Orleans Saints practice squad. He signed a reserve/future contract with the Saints on January 21, 2019. He was waived/injured on July 30, 2019 and placed on injured reserve. He was waived from injured reserve on August 22.

San Francisco 49ers
On August 27, 2019, Campbell was signed by the San Francisco 49ers. He was waived during final roster cuts on August 30, 2019.

Saskatchewan Roughriders
Campbell signed with the Saskatchewan Roughriders of the CFL on March 20, 2020. After the CFL canceled the 2020 season due to the COVID-19 pandemic, Campbell chose to opt-out of his contract with the Roughriders on August 28, 2020. He opted back in to his contract on January 20, 2021.

Tampa Bay Bandits
Campbell was selected with first pick of the tenth round of the 2022 USFL Draft by the Tampa Bay Bandits. He was transferred to the team's inactive roster on May 6, 2022, with a thigh injury. He was moved back to the active roster on May 11. He was moved back to the inactive roster on May 20 with the thigh injury.

Campbell and all other Tampa Bay Bandits players were all transferred to the Memphis Showboats after it was announced that the Bandits were taking a hiatus and that the Showboats were joining the league. On January 11, 2023, Campbell was released by the Showboats.

References

External links

Penn State Nittany Lions bio

Living people
1995 births
American football cornerbacks
Arizona Cardinals players
New Orleans Saints players
Penn State Nittany Lions football players
People from Phenix City, Alabama
Players of American football from Alabama
San Francisco 49ers players
Saskatchewan Roughriders players
Tampa Bay Bandits (2022) players